Emanuel Archibald (born 9 September 1994) is a Guyanese sprinter and long jumper.

In the long jump he finished 8th at the 2017 Islamic Solidarity Games, 4th at the 2018 Central American and Caribbean Games.

In the 100 metres he reached the semi-final at the 2018 Central American and Caribbean Games and the 2018 Commonwealth Games, and finished 5th at the 2019 South American Championships.

His personal best 100 m time is 10.22 seconds, achieved in February 2018 in Kingston. His personal best jump is 8.12 metres, achieved in May 2019 in Kingston. This is the Guyanese record.

In 2019, he competed in the men's long jump at the 2019 World Athletics Championships held in Doha, Qatar. He did not qualify to compete in the final.

He has qualified to represent Guyana at the 2020 Summer Olympics.

References

1994 births
Living people
Guyanese male sprinters
Guyanese male long jumpers
Athletes (track and field) at the 2018 Commonwealth Games
Commonwealth Games competitors for Guyana
Competitors at the 2018 Central American and Caribbean Games
Athletes (track and field) at the 2019 Pan American Games
Athletes (track and field) at the 2020 Summer Olympics
Olympic male sprinters
Olympic athletes of Guyana
Pan American Games competitors for Guyana
Athletes (track and field) at the 2022 Commonwealth Games